The 1916–17 Princeton Tigers men's ice hockey season was the 18th season of play for the program.

Season
Princeton opened the season with three games over the winter break, taking two of the matches. senior netminder Henry Ford was the star of the games and there was hope that the Tigers would ride his play back to the top of the college hockey landscape. Championship aspirations were dealt a serious blow when Princeton lost to Dartmouth in the intercollegiate opener.

Yale handed Princeton its third consecutive loss and, though the Tigers played better after shuffling their lineup, they were in danger of falling to the bottom of the league standings. More experience with the new arrangement helped Princeton arrest their fall and take down the Bulldogs in the rematch, albeit in double overtime. The team was looking like they had an outside chance at the championship when the defeated Harvard 2–1 thanks to a goal from captain William Schoen with just 15 seconds remaining.

Harvard returned the favor with a win of their own in early February. Princeton had a 22-day layoff before the deciding game against the Crimson and the team was unable to score in a 0–2 loss. The Tigers were able to end their season on a high note when they battled Yale for the third time. Both teams were tied at 2 after regulation but as neither could score in the first two 5-minute overtimes, a third sudden-death overtime was instituted. This may be the first college game to go past the second overtime.

A few weeks later Yale won their series against Harvard, putting the teams in a three-way tie. After the season John Humphreys was selected as the top Point in college hockey.

Due to the United States entering World War I in April, Princeton's ice hockey team was suspended for the duration of the war. The team would return to the ice for the end of the 1918–19 season.

Roster

Standings

Schedule and Results

|-
!colspan=12 style=";" | Regular Season

References

Princeton Tigers men's ice hockey seasons
Princeton
Princeton
Princeton
Princeton